Live at the Paramount may refer to:

 Live at the Paramount (The Guess Who album)
 Live at the Paramount (video), live video and album by Nirvana